The Zimbabwean dollar (sign: $, or Z$ to distinguish it from other dollar-denominated currencies) was the name of four official currencies of Zimbabwe from 1980 to 12 April 2009. During this time, it was subject to periods of extreme inflation, followed by a period of hyperinflation.

The Zimbabwean dollar was introduced in 1980 to directly replace the Rhodesian dollar (which had been introduced in 1970) at par (1:1), at a similar value to the US dollar. In the 20th century the dollar functioned as a normal currency, but in the early 21st century hyperinflation in Zimbabwe reduced the Zimbabwean dollar to one of the lowest valued currency units in the world. It was redenominated three times (in 2006, 2008 and 2009), with denominations up to a $100 trillion banknote issued. The final redenomination produced the "fourth dollar" (ZWL), which was worth 1025 ZWD (first dollars).

Use of the Zimbabwean dollar as an official currency was effectively abandoned on 12 April 2009. It was demonetised in 2015, with outstanding accounts able to be reimbursed until 30 April 2016. In place of the Zimbabwean dollar, currencies including the South African rand, Botswana pula, pound sterling, Indian rupee, euro, Japanese yen, Australian dollar, Chinese yuan, and the United States dollar were used.

On 24 June 2019, the Reserve Bank of Zimbabwe abolished the multiple-currency system and replaced it with a new Zimbabwe dollar (the RTGS Dollar), which was the only official currency in the country between June 2019 and March 2020, after which multiple foreign currencies were allowed again.

Origin 
The Zimbabwean dollar's predecessor, the Rhodesian dollar, was essentially equal to half of the value of the pound sterling at the time of its adoption (during the decimalisation of 1970). A similar practice was used in other Commonwealth countries such as South Africa, Australia, and New Zealand. The selection of the name was motivated by the fact that the reduced value of the new unit correlated more closely to the value of the US dollar than to the pound sterling.

Design 
The main illustration on the obverse of all of the banknotes was the Chiremba Balancing Rocks in Epworth, Harare, which were used as a metaphor demonstrating the importance of balancing development and the preservation of the fragile environment. The reverse side of dollar notes often illustrated the culture or landmarks of Zimbabwe.

History

Initial introduction (ZWD) 

The first Zimbabwean dollar was introduced in 1980 and replaced the Rhodesian dollar at par. The initial ISO 4217 code was ZWD. At the time of its introduction, the Zimbabwean dollar was worth more than the US dollar in the official exchange market, with 1 ZWD = , although this did not reflect the actual purchasing power it held.

The value of the dollar began to erode significantly from August 1991 onwards: originally, this was because of the Economic Structural Adjustment Programme (ESAP), a programme of economic liberalisation that dismantled a planned "siege" economy from the UDI era. However, the ESAP caused widespread poverty and unemployment, since many of the lost jobs depended on formerly-subsidised exports with reduced global demand. The widespread poverty and unemployment, combined with impromptu spending to support veterans of the Rhodesian Bush War, resulted in a major currency crash on 14 November 1997.

The currency's official and parallel rates continued to plummet in the context in falling incomes from exports, the chaotic redistribution of land to inexperienced farmers, and Zimbabwe's involvement in the Second Congo War. By July 2006, the parallel market value of the Zimbabwean dollar fell to one millionth of a pound sterling (Z$1,000,000 = £1).

First re-denomination (ZWN) 
In October 2005, the current Governor of the Reserve Bank of Zimbabwe at the time, Dr. Gideon Gono, announced that Zimbabwe would have a new currency the following year, and new banknotes and coins would be produced. However, in June 2006, it was decreed that, for a new currency to be viable, Zimbabwe had to first achieve macro-economic stability. Instead, in August 2006, the first dollar was redenominated to the second dollar at the rate of 1000 first dollars to 1 second dollar (1000:1). At the same time, the currency was devalued against the US dollar, from 101000 first dollars (101 once revalued) to 250 second dollars, a decrease of about 60% (see exchange rate history table below). ISO originally assigned a new currency code of ZWN to this redenominated currency, but the Reserve Bank of Zimbabwe could not deal with a currency change, so the currency code remained 'ZWD'. The revaluation campaign, which Gideon Gono named "Operation Sunrise", was completed on 21 August 2006. It was estimated that some ten trillion old Zimbabwe dollars (22% of the money supply) were not redeemed during this period.

The following year, on 2 February 2007, the RBZ revealed that a new (third) dollar would be released. However, with inflation still exceeding 1000%, the banknotes were kept in storage. During the same month, the Reserve Bank of Zimbabwe declared inflation illegal, outlawing any raise in prices on certain commodities between 1 March and 30 June 2007. Officials arrested executives of some Zimbabwean companies for increasing prices on their products, and economists reported that "chaos had started to reign and people in the public sector became frantic".

As an official exchange rate became more unreliable, the WM/Reuters company introduced a notional exchange rate (ISO ZWN) which was based on Purchasing Power Parity utilising the dual listing of companies on the Harare (ZH) and London Stock exchanges (LN).

Second re-denomination (ZWR) 

On 30 July 2008, the dollar was redenominated and given a new currency code of ZWR. After 1 August 2008, 10 billion ZWN were worth 1 ZWR. Due to frequent cash shortages and the apparently worthless Zimbabwean dollar, foreign currency was effectively legalised as a de facto currency on 13 September 2008 via a special program. This program officially allowed a number of retailers to accept foreign money. This reflected the reality of the dollarisation of the economy, with many shop keepers refusing to accept Zimbabwe dollars and requesting US dollars or South African rand instead. Despite redenomination, the RBZ was forced to print banknotes of ever higher values to keep up with surging inflation, with ten zeros reappearing by the end of 2008. While worthless at the time, these 100 trillion dollar notes subsequently became popular with collectors.

Third re-denomination (ZWL) 
On 2 February 2009, the RBZ announced that a further 12 zeros were to be taken off the currency, with 1,000,000,000,000 third Zimbabwean dollars being exchanged for 1 new fourth dollar. The banknotes of the fourth dollar circulated alongside the third dollar, which remained legal tender until 30 June 2009. The new ISO currency code was ZWL.

Despite the introduction of the fourth dollar, the problems were not eliminated, and the economy continued to be almost completely dollarised. In his first budget, the Zimbabwe finance minister, Tendai Biti, stated "the death of the Zimbabwe dollar is a reality we have to live with. Since October 2008 our national currency has become moribund". In late January 2009, acting Finance Minister Patrick Chinamasa announced that all Zimbabweans would be allowed to conduct business with any currency, as a response to the hyperinflation crisis. On 12 April 2009, media outlets reported that economic planning minister Elton Mangoma had announced the suspension of the local currency "for at least a year", effectively terminating the fourth dollar.

Withdrawal

Hyperinflation 
All four issues of the Zimbabwean dollar experienced high rates of inflation, although it was not until the early 2000s that Zimbabwe started to experience totally unsustainable hyperinflation.

On 13 July 2007, the Zimbabwean government said that it had temporarily stopped publishing (official) inflation figures, a move that observers said was meant to draw attention away from "runaway inflation which has come to symbolise the country's unprecedented economic meltdown". In 2008, the inflation rate accelerated dramatically, from a rate in January of over 100,000% to an estimated rate of over 1,000,000% by May, and nearly 250,000,000% in July. As predicted by the quantity theory of money, this hyperinflation was linked to the Reserve Bank of Zimbabwe's choice to increase the money supply.

Money supply (2006–2008) 

The Reserve Bank of Zimbabwe responded to the dwindling value of the dollar by repeatedly arranging the printing of further banknotes, often at great expense from overseas suppliers.

On 1 March 2008 The Sunday Times  reported that it had obtained documents showing that the Munich company Giesecke & Devrient (G&D) was receiving more than €500,000 (£381,562) a week for delivering bank notes to the value of Z$170 trillion a week. By late 2008, inflation had risen so high that automated teller machines for one major bank gave a "data overflow error" and stopped customers' attempts to withdraw money with so many zeros.

In June 2008, U.S. officials announced they would not take any action against G&D.
It was reported that on 1 July 2008 the company's management board decided to cease delivering banknote paper to the Reserve Bank of Zimbabwe with immediate effect. The decision was in response to an "official request" from the German government and calls for international sanctions by the European Union and the United Nations.

Abandonment and demonetisation 

The use of foreign currencies was legalised in January 2009, causing general consumer prices to stabilise again after years of hyperinflation and price speculation. The move led to a sharp drop in the usage of the Zimbabwean dollar, as hyperinflation rendered even the highest denominations worthless. The Zimbabwean dollar was effectively abandoned as an official currency on 12 April 2009, when the Economic Planning Minister Elton Mangoma confirmed the suspension of the national currency for at least a year.

On 29 January 2014, the Zimbabwe central bank announced that the US dollar, South African rand, Botswana pula, pound sterling, Euro, Australian dollar, Chinese yuan (renminbi), Indian rupee, and Japanese yen would all be accepted as legal currency within the country.

In June 2015, the Reserve Bank of Zimbabwe began to formally demonetise the Zimbabwean dollar, reducing its value steadily to zero in order to complete a switch to the US dollar by the end of September 2015. The Zimbabwean government stated that it would credit 5 US dollars to domestic bank accounts with balances of up to 175 quadrillion Zimbabwean dollars, and that it would exchange Zimbabwean dollars for US dollars at a rate of US$1 to 35 quadrillion Zimbabwean dollars to accounts with balances above 175 quadrillion Zimbabwean dollars. This move was meant to stabilise the economy and establish a credible nominal anchor under low inflation conditions. The exercise brought closure to the outstanding issue on the Zimbabwe dollar, further confirming the government's position that the local unit will not return anytime soon. The Government has maintained that the return of the Zimbabwe dollar will only be considered when key economic fundamentals, such as productivity in key sectors, have been achieved.

Similar to the Iraqi dinar scam, some promoters claim that a future "revalue" (RV) event will cause Zimbabwe dollar notes to regain some nonzero fraction of their original value.

Coins 
In 1980, coins were introduced in denominations of 1, 5, 10, 20, 50 cents, and 1 dollar. The 1 cent coin was struck in bronze, with the others struck in cupro-nickel. In 1989, bronze-plated steel replaced bronze. A 2-dollar coin was introduced in 1997. In 2001, nickel-plated steel replaced cupro-nickel in the 10, 20 and 50 cents and 1 dollar coins, and a bimetallic 5-dollar coin was introduced. The Reserve Bank of Zimbabwe announced plans for new  and  coins in June 2005, although these were never actually struck.

In its 2014 mid-term monetary policy statement, the Reserve Bank of Zimbabwe (RBZ) said it would import special coins, known as Zimbabwean bond coins, to ease a shortage of change in the economy. Like the original 1980 coins, these special coins would be denominated in 1, 5, 10, 20, and 50 cents, but would have values at par with US cents. There would also be South African rand coins of 10, 20, 50 cents, 1, 2, 5 rands. The RBZ's statement did not specify when or where these coins would be imported from, but a later report on 26 November 2014 clarified that over $40 million worth of these coins were expected to be delivered within the next week from Pretoria. On 18 December 2014, the 1, 5, 10, and 25 US cent denominations were released into circulation. The 50 US cent denomination followed in March 2015. A 1 dollar bond coin was released in November 2016.

Banknotes and cheques 

The banknotes of the Zimbabwean dollar were issued by the Reserve Bank of Zimbabwe from 1980 to 2009. Up to 2003, regular banknotes were issued, but as hyperinflation developed from 2003, the Reserve Bank issued short-lived emergency traveller's cheques.

Exchange rate history 
This table shows a condensed history of the foreign exchange rate of the Zimbabwean Dollars to one US Dollar:

The third dollar rates above are OMIR. The cash rate differs significantly to the above rates. The table below is the cash rate of the third dollar history:

Initial period of devaluation 

This table shows in more detail the historical value of one US dollar in Zimbabwean dollars:

Second period of devaluation 
In the first redenomination of 1 August 2006, 1000 ZWD were exchanged for 1 second dollar (ZWN). By July 2008 the exchange rate with US$ had reached (parallel rate) 500 billion to 1 , leading to a second redenomination.

More detailed data can be found in the table below:

Market data restoration 

In the final months before Zimbabwe's central bank reforms of 30 April 2008, virtually all popular currency conversion resources relied upon the official rate of 30,000 ZWD to US$1 for published figures, in spite of the vast differences between that and free market rates. By 23 May 2008, Bloomberg and Oanda began publishing floating rates based on Zimbabwe's formally regulated domestic bank market, while Yahoo Finance started using the updated official rate in July, albeit with a decimal point shift of 6 places. Those reported rates generally reflected the Official Rate as shown in the above table. They soon began to differ, in overvaluation of the Zimbabwean dollar, increasingly substantially in comparison to less regulated markets such as offshore markets or paper cash freely traded on the streets of Harare, reflected above as Parallel Rates.

Third period of devaluation 
On 1 August 2008, a second redenomination was conducted, in which 10,000,000,000 2nd dollars (ZWN) became 1 3rd dollar (ZWR). On 3 October 2008, the Reserve Bank of Zimbabwe temporarily suspended the Real Time Gross Settlement (RTGS) system, halting electronic parallel market transfers, but it was reinstated on 13 November 2008.

After being introduced on 1 August 2008, the third dollar continued to devalue.

An overview of the exchange rate data can be found in the table below:

Final period of devaluation 
On 2 February 2009, a third redenomination took place, in which the RBZ removed 12 zeros from the currency, with 1,000,000,000,000 (third, ZWR) Zimbabwe dollars being exchanged for 1 new (fourth, ZWL) dollar. Therefore, the fourth dollar (ZWL) is equivalent to 10,000,000,000,000,000,000,000,000, or 1×1025 or 10 septillion first dollars (ZWD) (or 1 trillion third dollars). Although the dollar was abandoned on 12 April 2009, exchange rates were maintained at intervals for some months.

On 4 June 2015, it was announced that the Reserve Bank of Zimbabwe would exchange some of the old banknotes for US dollars.

Value as collectable
Shortly after the Zimbabwean dollar was discontinued, they were purchased as curiosities, or in quantity as novelty gifts, for example to financial advisers' clients to show why they should invest in diverse assets instead of cash, which loses its value over the long term. Later they were purchased as an investment, to sell to collectors, for a very much better rate of return than most investments. In 2022 various denominations were sold on eBay at prices exceeding £100.

See also 

 Argentine peso - another currency that hyperinflated multi-trillionfold since 1970
 Hungarian pengő - a currency that dropped 29 zeroes in 1946
 Zimbabwean bond notes/coins
 Banknotes of Zimbabwe
 Economy of Zimbabwe
 Redenomination
 Hyperinflation

Notes

References

Further reading

External links 

 Historical banknotes from Zimbabwe 

Currencies of Africa
Currencies of the Commonwealth of Nations
Currencies introduced in 1980
Currencies of Zimbabwe
Dollar
Modern obsolete currencies
1980 establishments in Zimbabwe
2009 disestablishments in Zimbabwe